Cặp đôi hoàn hảo is the Vietnamese version of BBC UK series Just the Two of Us. The first season is set to air on Sunday 4 October at 9:00PM (UTC+7) on VTV3.

It was first announced that Cẩm Vân, Tuấn Khanh and director Phạm Hoài Nam would serve as permanent judges. Later director Lê Hoàng and Siu Black, the two familiar faces of Bước nhảy hoàn vũ were confirmed on the table with musician Lê Minh Sơn. Also, the fourth-judging spot of the table was introduced to be fulfilled by guests from week 2 onwards.

Format 
The show share the same format with its sister show Strictly Come Dancing (corresponding to Bước nhảy hoàn vũ in Vietnam). Selected celebrities are coupled with professional singers and they compete against each other each week in a sing-off to impress a panel of judges and ultimately the viewing public in order to survive potential elimination.

Through both telephone and SMS voting, viewers vote for the duo they think should remain in the competition. Judges scores which are half weight of the total scores, are also taken into account and are combined with the viewer votes when determining which duos stay and go each week.

Couples

Chart

Scoring 

red numbers indicate the lowest score for each week.
Green numbers indicate the highest score for each week.
Underlined numbers indicate the favorite contestant of the week
 indicates the winning couple.
 indicates the runner-up couple.
 indicates the third-place couple.
 indicates the returning couple that finished in the bottom two.
 indicates the couple eliminated that week.
 indicates the couple eliminated that week with the lowest total scores from either judges or audience' votes.
 indicates the couple withdrawing while in the bottom two.

Call-out Order 

 This couple came in first place with the judges.
 This couple came in last place with the judges.
 This couple came in last place with the judges and was eliminated.
 This couple was eliminated.
 This couple withdrew.
 This couple was audience's favorite of the week.
 This couple came in first place with the judges and was audience's favorite of the week.
 This couple came in last place with the judges and was audience's favorite of the week.
 This couple won the competition.
 This couple came in second in the competition.
 This couple came in third in the competition

Genres, scores and songs

Week 1 
Air date: 9 October, 2011
Theme(s): None
Location: Nguyen Du Gymnasium, Ho Chi Minh City
Guest judge: Not applied

Running order

Week 2 + 3

Week 2 
Air date: 16 October
Theme(s): Pop or Ballad
Location: Van Don Gymnasium, Ho Chi Minh City
Guest judge: Hồ Hoài Anh

Individual judges' scores in charts below (given in parentheses) are listed in this order from left to right: Lê Minh Sơn - Siu Black - Hồ Hoài Anh - Lê Hoàng. The results of the voting is combined with the ranking of the panel of judges, and the celebrities have the higher scores in total survive.

Performing order

Week 3 
Air date: 23 October
Theme(s): World Hits
Location: Nguyen Du Gymnasium, Ho Chi Minh City
Guest judge: Đức Huy
Guests' performances: Ngô Phương Lan & Nathan Lee ("A Whole New World" / "Can You Feel the Love Tonight" / "Beauty and the Beast (Disney)"), Lam Trường & Tiêu Châu Như Quỳnh ("Yêu em")
Individual judges' scores in charts below (given in parentheses) are listed in this order from left to right: Lê Minh Sơn - Siu Black - Đức Huy - Lê Hoàng. The results of the voting is combined with the ranking of the panel of judges, and the celebrities have the higher scores in total survive.

Performing order

Judges' vote to eliminate
Lê Minh Sơn: N/A
Siu Black: N/A
Đức Huy: N/A
Lê Hoàng: N/A

In combination

Week 4 
Air date: 30 October
Theme(s): Rock / Folk-inspired
Location: Nguyen Du Gymnasium, Ho Chi Minh City
Guest judge: Nguyễn Cường

Individual judges' scores in charts below (given in parentheses) are listed in this order from left to right: Lê Minh Sơn - Siu Black - Nguyễn Cường - Lê Hoàng. The results of the voting is combined with the ranking of the panel of judges, and the celebrities have the higher scores in total survive.

Performing order

Week 5 
Air date: November 06
Genre(s): Hip hop / Dance / Blues-Jazz
Guest Judge: Lê Quang
Guest performances: Thanh Lam & Tùng Dương ("Tình nghệ sĩ"), Hồng Nhung & Minh Béo ("Lời của gió")

Individual judges' scores in charts below (given in parentheses) are listed in this order from left to right: Lê Minh Sơn - Siu Black - Lê Hoàng. The results of the voting is combined with the ranking of the panel of judges, and the celebrities have the higher scores in total survive.

Performing order

Week 6 
Air date: 20 November
Genre(s):
Guest judge: Việt Tú

Individual judges' scores in charts below (given in parentheses) are listed in this order from left to right: Lê Minh Sơn - Siu Black - Việt Tú - Lê Hoàng. The results of the voting is combined with the ranking of the panel of judges, and the celebrities have the higher scores in total survive.

Performing order

Week 7 
Air date: 27 November
Genre(s): One genre not performed / Top hit from the partner
Guest judge: Phương Uyên

Individual judges' scores in charts below (given in parentheses) are listed in this order from left to right: Lê Minh Sơn - Siu Black - Phương Uyên - Lê Hoàng. The results of the voting is combined with the ranking of the panel of judges, and the celebrities have the higher scores in total survive.

Performing order

Week 8 - Grand finale 
Air date: 4 DecemberGenre(s):Guest judge: Hồ Hoài AnhIndividual judges scores in charts below (given in parentheses) are listed in this order from left to right: Lê Minh Sơn - Siu Black - Hồ Hoài Anh - Lê Hoàng. The results of the voting is combined with the ranking of the panel of judges, and the celebrities have the higher scores in total survive.''

Performing order

References

External links 
List of television programmes broadcast by Vietnam Television (VTV)
 

Vietnamese television series
Singing talent shows
2010s Vietnamese television series
2011 Vietnamese television series debuts
2011 Vietnamese television series endings